The Commemorative Medal for Armed Humanitarian Operations is a military decoration of Belgium. It was established on 11 September 1987 and is awarded to military and civilian members of the Belgian Armed Forces who participated in armed humanitarian operations. Although never explicitly stated, in practice, the medal is only awarded for a select number of operations on African soil.

Medal description
The medal is circular and struck from bronze, the obverse bears at its center a blue enamelled octagon with a yellow enamelled five-pointed star in the center. The obverse of the medal is plain. The ribbon is azure blue, with three thin longitudinal in the national colours of Belgium, black, yellow and red.

The ribbon is adorned with small bronze clasps bearing the names of the operations in which the recipient participated.

Statute
The Commemorative Medal for Armed Humanitarian Operations is awarded to military and civilian members of the Belgian Armed Forces who participated in good standing in armed humanitarian operations. The list of the operations for which the medal is awarded was initially included in the Royal Decree creating the medal, which was often amended. Currently, the award of the medal is very rare, but no longer required an amendment to the Royal Decree.

As for the Commemorative Medal for Foreign Operations or Missions, Belgium does not award different medals for each operation. If a person participated in more than one such operation, he or she will be awarded the Commemorative Medal for Armed Humanitarian Operations for each of these operations, each award represented by an additional clasp on the ribbon.

The award of the medal is not automatic. In order to be awarded the medal, one who meets the award conditions has to request it. The medal is awarded by the Human Resources Department of the Belgian Armed Forces. In the period 2009–2013, the Commemorative Medal for Armed Humanitarian Operations was awarded 119 times.

See also
 List of Orders, Decorations and Medals of the Kingdom of Belgium

References
 Royal Decree of 11 September 1987 Creating a Commemorative Medal for Armed Humanitarian Operations
 Belgian military regulation DGHR-REG-DISPSYS-001 of 20 February 2006
 Quinot H., 1950, Recueil illustré des décorations belges et congolaises, 4e Edition. (Hasselt)
 Cornet R., 1982, Recueil des dispositions légales et réglementaires régissant les ordres nationaux belges. 2e Ed. N.pl.,  (Brussels)
 Borné A.C., 1985, Distinctions honorifiques de la Belgique, 1830-1985 (Brussels)
 Report of written questions and answers in the Belgian House of Representatives, 17 March 2014 (QRVA 53–152)

External links
 Commemorative Medal for Armed Humanitarian Operations

1987 establishments in Belgium
Military awards and decorations of Belgium
Military of Belgium
Awards established in 1987